The Jungfraujoch radio relay station is a former Swisscom microwave radio relay station atop the Jungfraujoch, the mountain ridge between Mönch and Jungfrau, in the Swiss Alps.

Built in 1954, it was the first radio station to allow radio relay connections across the Alps. It has been used to transmit telephone and TV signals, and connected Germany with Italy in the international radio relay network. With the diminishing commercial importance of microwave radio relays due to the increasing availability of satellite and fiber-optic cable links, the station is no longer of practical importance, and Swisscom decided in 2009 to cease operating the station in 2013.

The Jungfraubahnen anticipated to be able to reuse the station building, which provides an excellent view to both sides of the ridge, for tourism purposes after the end of radio transmissions in 2013.

See also
List of buildings and structures above 3000 m in Switzerland

References

Microwave transmission